The Stein (2,172 m) is a mountain of the Swiss Lepontine Alps, overlooking Obersaxen in the canton of Graubünden. It lies between the main Rhine valley, the Surselva, and the Lumnezia. A cable car station (2,144 m) is located near the summit.

References

External links
 Stein on Hikr

Mountains of the Alps
Mountains of Graubünden
Lepontine Alps
Mountains of Switzerland
Two-thousanders of Switzerland